Éva Balázs (21 September 1942 – 6 January 1992) was a Hungarian cross-country skier. She competed at the 1964 Winter Olympics and the 1968 Winter Olympics.

References

External links
 

1942 births
1992 deaths
Hungarian female cross-country skiers
Olympic cross-country skiers of Hungary
Cross-country skiers at the 1964 Winter Olympics
Cross-country skiers at the 1968 Winter Olympics
Skiers from Budapest
20th-century Hungarian women